A SPARQCode is a matrix code (or two-dimensional bar code) encoding standard that is based on the physical QR Code definition created by Japanese corporation Denso-Wave.

Overview 
The QR Code standard as defined by Denso-Wave in ISO/IEC 18004 covers the physical encoding method of a binary data stream.  However, the Denso-Wave standard lacks an encoding standard for interpreting the data stream on the application layer for decoding URLs, phone numbers, and all other data types.  NTT Docomo has established de facto standards for encoding some data types such as URLs, and contact information in Japan, but not all applications in other countries adhere to this convention as listed by the open-source project "zxing" for QR Code data types.

Encoding standards 

The SPARQCode encoding standard specifies a convention for the following encoding data types. 

 E-mail address
 Phone Number
 SMS TEXT
 MAP
 URL
 BIZCARD
 MeCard
 vCard
 BlackBerry PIN
 Geographic information
 Google Play link
 Wifi Network config for Android
 YouTube URI
 iCalendar

The SPARQCode convention also recommends but does not require the inclusion of visual pictograms to denote the type of encoded data.

License 
The use of the SPARQCode is free of any license. The term SPARQCode itself is a trademark of MSKYNET, but has chosen to open it to be royalty-free.

References 

Barcodes
Encodings
Automatic identification and data capture
NTT Docomo